The Boucher Nude is a 1957 painting by Australian artist John Brack. The painting is a nude, depicting a woman lying on a sofa. Sasha Grishin, the William Dobell Professor of Art History at the Australian National University claimed that "The Boucher Nude can be justly regarded as one of the great masterpieces in Australian art." 

The painting is one of a set of nine oil paintingsBrack's first paintings of the nudefirst displayed in Melbourne in 1957. The series "subsequently become iconic in Australian art" with many ending up in public collections including Nude in an armchair (1957) purchased by the National Gallery of Victoria and Nude with two chairs (1957) acquired by the Art Gallery of New South Wales, both directly from this initial exhibition.

With what has been described as his "characteristic irony", Brack painted his thin dark-haired modelthe only one to respond to his advertisementin "the pose of the more voluptuous Mademoiselle O'Murphy, in François Boucher’s L’Odalisque (c.1745)""

In 2008, the painting was sold for AUD1,500,000.

References

Paintings by John Brack
1957 paintings
Nude art
Paintings in Australia